The 2014 Sport 1 Open was a professional tennis tournament played on clay courts. It was the 22nd edition of the tournament which was part of the 2014 ATP Challenger Tour. It took place in Scheveningen, Netherlands between 7 and 13 July 2014.

Singles main-draw entrants

Seeds

 1 Rankings are as of June 24, 2014.

Other entrants
The following players received wildcards into the singles main draw:
  Steve Darcis
  Matwé Middelkoop
  Tim Van Rijthoven
  Boy Westerhof

The following players received special exempt into the singles main draw:
  Enrique López Pérez

The following players received entry from the qualifying draw:
  Wesley Koolhof
  Dino Marcan
  Alexander Rumyantsev
  Marko Tepavac

Doubles main-draw entrants

Seeds

1 Rankings as of June 24, 2014.

Other entrants
The following pairs received wildcards into the doubles main draw:
  Roy de Valk /  Tim van Rijthoven
  Eric Haase /  Robin Haase
  Sander Arends /  Niels Lootsma

Champions

Singles

 David Goffin def.  Andreas Beck 6–3,6–2

Doubles

  Matwé Middelkoop /  Boy Westerhof def.  Jesse Huta Galung /  Martin Fischer 6–4, 3–6, [10–6]

External links
Official Website

Sport 1 Open
2014
2014 in Dutch tennis